Evergreen is a historic home at Owensville, Anne Arundel County, Maryland, United States. It is a -story white frame house composed of several sections, the earliest of which was built about 1760, and constructed by George Neall in the Federal style.  The house reflects building evolution from the third quarter of the 18th century to the late 19th century.

Evergreen was listed on the National Register of Historic Places in 1969.

References

External links
, including undated photo, at Maryland Historical Trust

Houses on the National Register of Historic Places in Maryland
Houses in Anne Arundel County, Maryland
Federal architecture in Maryland
Houses completed in 1853
National Register of Historic Places in Anne Arundel County, Maryland